Lake Carl Albert is a reservoir in Latimer County, Oklahoma, United States. The lake was formed as a result of the Scs-Rock Creek Site-02 dam on Rock Creek and is used for flood control, drinking water and recreation purposes. Construction was completed in 1964. It is owned by the town of Talihina.

Etymology 
The lake was named for Carl Albert, a native of McAlester, Oklahoma and a very popular politician. He represented his home district in the U. S. House of Representatives from 1947 until 1977, and at the peak of his political career, he was Speaker of the House from 1971 to 1977. After retiring from the House, Albert continued to maintain an office in McAlester, where he continued to work on public issues until his death in 2000.

Description of lake and dam 
The dam is of earthen construction and the core is assessed to be homogeneous earth. The foundation is reportedly soil. Maximum discharge is 1,050 cubic feet per second. Its capacity is 5,414 acre feet. Normal storage is 2,739 acre feet. Its watershed drains an area of 6.03 square miles  and has  of shoreline.

References

Latimer County, Oklahoma
Lakes of Oklahoma
Infrastructure completed in 1964